Tohouri Zahoui Constant Djakpa (born 17 October 1986) is an Ivorian professional footballer who plays as a left back for Hessen Dreieich.

Career
On 12 September 2018, Djakpa joined Regionalliga Südwest side Hessen Dreieich.

International career 
Djakpa played for the national Olympic team and for the Ivory Coast U21. He represented his country at the 2008 Toulon Tournament, scoring two goals, one a penalty against the United States, and one against Chile.

Represented the team at 2014 World Cup.

References

External links
 
 
 

1986 births
Living people
Ivorian footballers
Ivory Coast international footballers
2008 Africa Cup of Nations players
Liga I players
CS Pandurii Târgu Jiu players
Bayer 04 Leverkusen players
Hannover 96 players
Eintracht Frankfurt players
1. FC Nürnberg players
Bundesliga players
2. Bundesliga players
Association football defenders
Footballers from Abidjan
Expatriate footballers in Romania
Expatriate footballers in Germany
Ivorian expatriate sportspeople in Romania
Stella Club d'Adjamé players
Ivorian expatriates in Germany
2014 FIFA World Cup players
Sogndal Fotball players
Ivory Coast under-20 international footballers
SC Hessen Dreieich players